Martha Isabel Garvice  (née Ormiston; 1888–1958) was an Australian medical doctor who was recognised for her service with the British Army in the First World War.

She was born in Albury, New South Wales  in 1882. She graduated as a doctor from the University of Sydney in 1907. She travelled to London in 1914, six months before the outbreak of the First World War. She worked with the Red Cross in London and then went to Ostend, Belgium. She remained at her post at the Queen of the Belgians' Hospital when Ostend was overrun by the Germans in 1914, and later received the Order of Leopold of Belgium, the King's medal for "conspicuous bravery and devotion to duty". Ormiston was a prisoner of the invading army until late October, when all British citizens were expelled from Belgium.

She was at La Panne (1914–15), Wounded Allies' Relief (W.A.R.) Hospital, Montenegro (1915–17), British Red Cross Depot, Egypt (1916), and W.A.R. Hospital, Limoges.

1920 marriage to Garvice DSO

She was awarded the Montenegrin Red Cross and Orders of Danilo and the Nile. She later took up the position of Senior Lady Medical Officer, Egyptian Ministry of Education.

In 1928, she was awarded the Member of the Order of the British Empire.
She died in July 1958 in Australia.

References

1958 deaths
1888 births
Australian military doctors
People from Albury, New South Wales
University of Sydney alumni
Australian Members of the Order of the British Empire
20th-century Australian medical doctors
19th-century Australian women
20th-century Australian women